The Philomath School District is a school district in the U.S. state of Oregon that serves part of Benton County, including the city of Philomath and the unincorporated community of Blodgett. The district has an enrollment of 1,635 students.

Schools
The district operates 6 schools.

Elementary schools
 Clemens Primary School (K–2)
 Blodgett Elementary School (K–4)
 Philomath Elementary School (3–5)

Middle schools
 Philomath Middle School (6 - 8)

High schools
Philomath High School (9–12)

Charter schools
Kings Valley Charter School (Pre-K through 12th grade)

See also 
 List of school districts in Oregon

References 

School districts in Oregon
Education in Benton County, Oregon